Terézváros (English: Theresa Town, German: Theresienstadt) is the District VI of Budapest, and was named after Queen Maria Theresa in 1777, who visited the neighbourhood 26 years earlier in 1751. The territory was first inhabited in the early 18th century when the old town of Pest (today: Inner City) was already fully built, so that people had to inhabit lands outside the city. Terézváros was one of the ten districts that were formed when the city of Budapest was created in 1873.
Today Terézváros is the second in population density after the neighbouring Erzsébetváros. Terézváros is meanwhile the second smallest district (also the first being Erzsébetváros). Both districts are famous for their night life.

Location
Terézváros is located in the Pest side of Budapest.

Neighbours of District VI are (clockwise from north):
District XIII
District XIV: Zugló
District VII: Erzsébetváros ("Elizabeth Town"), known of the historical Jewish quarter
District V: Belváros-Lipótváros ("Inner City – Leopold Town")

Landmarks
 Andrássy Avenue 
Millennium Underground Railway
Hungarian State Opera House
Franz Liszt Academy of Music
House of Terror Museum

Politics 
The current mayor of VI. District of Budapest is Tamás Soproni (Momentum).

The District Assembly, elected at the 2019 local government elections, is made up of 15 members (1 Mayor, 10 Individual constituencies MEPs and 4 Compensation List MEPs) divided into this political parties and alliances:

List of mayors

Twin towns
Terézváros is twinned with:
  Lenti, Zala County
  Târgu Secuiesc, Romania
  Temerin, Serbia
  Zadar, Croatia
  Drezda, Germany

See also

 List of districts in Budapest

Notes

References